Lithostege is a genus of moths in the family Geometridae erected by Jacob Hübner in 1825.

Species
 Lithostege amoenata Christoph, 1885
 Lithostege ancyrana Prout, 1938
 Lithostege angelicata Dyar, 1923
 Lithostege bosporaria (Herrich-Schäffer, 1847)
 Lithostege castiliaria Staudinger, 1877
 Lithostege coassata (Hübner, 1825)
 Lithostege deserticola Barnes & McDunnough, 1916
 Lithostege distinctata Christoph, 1887
 Lithostege duponchelli Prout, 1938
 Lithostege elegans (Grossbeck, 1909)
 Lithostege excelsata (Erschoff, 1874)
 Lithostege farinata (Hufnagel, 1767)
 Lithostege fissurata Mabille, 1888
 Lithostege fuscata (Grossbeck, 1906)
 Lithostege griseata (Denis & Schiffermüller, 1775)
 Lithostege infuscata (Eversmann, 1837)
 Lithostege luigi Viidalepp, 1992
 Lithostege luminosata Christoph, 1885
 Lithostege marcata Barnes & McDunnough, 1916
 Lithostege mesoleucata Püngeler, 1899
 Lithostege narynensis Prout, 1938
 Lithostege obliquata Urbahn, 1971
 Lithostege ochraceata Staudinger, 1901
 Lithostege odessaria (Boisduval, 1848)
 Lithostege palaestinensis Amsel, 1935
 Lithostege pallescens Staudinger, 1896
 Lithostege parva Stshetkin, 1963
 Lithostege rotundata Packard, 1874
 Lithostege senata Christoph, 1887
 Lithostege staudingeri Erschoff, 1874
 Lithostege turkmenica Tsvetajev, 1971
 Lithostege usgentaria Christoph, 1885

References

Chesiadini